Pete Riski (born 9 January 1974) is a Finnish music video director. He has directed music videos for hard rock band Lordi, among others, and directed the 2008 horror film Dark Floors.

Riski was born in Rovaniemi and studied from 1992 to 1996 on Tornio College of Arts and Media in Kemi. He is currently a freelance director. He has worked for the following companies: Rattling Stick from UK, Sons and Daughters from Canada and the Helsinki-based Directors Guild.

Filmography

Music videos 
 Nylon Beat – Viimeinen
 Nylon Beat – Seksi vie ja taksi tuo
 Nylon Beat – Syytön
 Come Inside – Hold Me Now
 Z-MC: The Drum & the Bass
 Waldo's People – U Drive Me Crazy
 Waldo's People – 1000 Ways
 Jonna Tervomaa – Yhtä en saa
 Egortippi – Koivuniemen herra
 Paleface – The Ultimate Jedi Mind Trick – Episode IV
 Lordi – Would You Love a Monsterman?
 Lordi – Devil Is a Loser
 Lordi – Blood Red Sandman
 Lordi – Hard Rock Hallelujah
 Lordi – It Snows in Hell
 Lordi – Who's Your Daddy?
 Husky Rescue – New Light of Tomorrow
 Husky Rescue – Caravan
 Husky Rescue – They Are Coming
 Negative – End of the Line

Movies 
1997: Samuli Edelmann: Huilunsoittaja (short film)
2008: Dark Floors

Television 
2018: Bullets

References

External links 

1974 births
Living people
People from Rovaniemi
Finnish music video directors
Finnish film directors